Dr. Lawrence Sidney Thompson (1916–1986) worked at the University of Kentucky as the Director of Libraries and as a faculty member in the classics department. He wrote extensively on the processes of printing and publication. Dr. Thompson also researched processes for cataloging materials, frequently corresponding with European colleagues.

He was director of the Margaret I. King Library at the University of Kentucky from 1948 to 1963.

He was the author of Human Skin, a paper on Anthropodermic bibliopegy.

References

External links
 

University of Kentucky faculty
1916 births
1986 deaths
American librarians
Place of birth missing